Bogatoye, also known as Bogatyy, (Bogatoe, بوگاتوە) is a town in Atyrau Region, southwest Kazakhstan.

References

Atyrau Region
Cities and towns in Kazakhstan